Industrial rock is a fusion genre that fuses industrial music and rock music. It initially originated in the 1970s, and drew influence from early experimental and industrial acts such as Throbbing Gristle, Einstürzende Neubauten and Chrome. Industrial rock became more prominent in the 1980s with the success of artists such as Killing Joke, Swans, and partially Skinny Puppy, and later spawned the offshoot genre known as industrial metal. The genre was made more accessible to mainstream audiences in the 1990s with the aid of acts such as Nine Inch Nails and Marilyn Manson, both of which have released platinum-selling records.

History

Origins (late 1970s and 1980s) 
Richie Unterberger assessed the Red Krayola as "a precursor to industrial rock" with their 1967 record The Parable of Arable Land exhibiting music made by 50 people on anything from industrial power tools to a revving motorcycle whilst Pitchfork's Alex Lindhart assessed their 1968 follow up God Bless the Red Krayola and All Who Sail With It as being "bootleg Einstürzende Neubauten at its grimiest atonality". AllMusic critic Alex Henderson has stated that experimental group Cromagnon's 1969 record Orgasm foreshadowed the industrial rock sound. Specifically, Pitchfork's Zach Baron noted their song "Caledonia" for its "pre-industrial stomp". Krautrock musicians Michael Rother and Klaus Dinger included industrial noise on their track "Negativland" (from their 1972 debut Neu!) as well as krautrock band Faust on their track "Meadow Meal" (from their 1971 debut Faust).

In 1976, English musician David Bowie collaborated with American musician Iggy Pop on his 1977 solo debut The Idiot. Musically, the album is said to contain elements of industrial rock, notably the closing track, "Mass Production", which contains numerous "proto-industrial noises" created using tape loops, and is described by Hugo Wilcken as "early industrial electronica". The Idiot has been described as having a major influence on Joy Division, who formed shortly before its release. Joy Division were signed to the industrially themed label Factory Records which had been founded in 1978; their albums Unknown Pleasures (1979) and Closer (1980) heavily influenced the further development of industrial rock. Chrome has also been credited as the "beginning of industrial rock" and their 1978 Half Machine Lip Moves was listed on Wire's "100 Records That Set The World On Fire (When No One Was Listening)".

Industrial rock was created in the mid- to late 1970s, amidst the punk rock revolution and disco fever.  Prominent early industrial musicians include Throbbing Gristle, Cabaret Voltaire, NON, SPK and Z'EV. Many other artists have been cited as influences such as Kraftwerk, Gary Numan, and Tubeway Army as well as Einstürzende Neubauten and Fad Gadget. Many other musical performers were incorporating industrial music elements into a variety of musical styles.

Some post-punk performers developed styles parallel to industrial music's defining attributes. Pere Ubu's debut, The Modern Dance, was described by Jim Irvin as "industrial", and Chris Connelly said the musical project Foetus was "the instigator when it comes to the marriage of machinery to hardcore punk." Music journalist Simon Reynolds considered Killing Joke, which saw mainstream success with their 1985 album Night Time, "a post-punk version of heavy metal."

Others followed in their wake. The New York City band Swans were inspired by the local no wave scene, as well as punk rock, noise music (particularly Whitehouse) and the original industrial groups. Steve Albini's Big Black followed a similar path, while also incorporating American hardcore punk. Big Black has also been closely associated with post-hardcore and noise rock, though their ties to industrial music are extremely apparent. The Swiss trio The Young Gods, who deliberately eschewed electric guitars in favor of a sampler, also took inspiration from both hardcore and industrial. In 1986, Canadian band Skinny Puppy released the album Mind: The Perpetual Intercourse, with its lead single, "Dig It", seeing frequent airplay on MTV. The song was a major influence on Nine Inch Nails founder Trent Reznor, who used it as inspiration when writing his first song, "Down in It".

Chicago's Wax Trax! Records became a vanguard for the genre in the 1980s and is credited for introducing it to the United States. Ministry's 1988 album The Land of Rape and Honey, departed from the band's synthesizer-oriented sound for a rock style that drew from hardcore punk and thrash metal, while retaining electronic elements and samples. Ministry frontman Al Jourgensen was also involved in multiple industrial rock side projects that were signed to Wax Trax!, including Revolting Cocks, 1000 Homo DJs and Pailhead. Drawing heavy influences from the New York's no wave scene, Cop Shoot Cop incorporated two bass guitars with no guitars.

Mainstream popularity (1990s)

In the 1990s, industrial rock broke into the mainstream with artists and bands such as Nine Inch Nails, Orgy,  White Zombie, and Marilyn Manson. In December 1992, Nine Inch Nails' EP Broken was certified platinum by the Recording Industry Association of America (RIAA). Nine Inch Nails gained further popularity with the release of their 1994 album The Downward Spiral, which was certified 4× platinum by the RIAA in 1998. The band's 1999 album The Fragile was certified 2× platinum in January 2000. With the success of Nine Inch Nails, the band's debut album Pretty Hate Machine was certified 3× platinum by the RIAA. In the 1990s, four Nine Inch Nails songs went on the Billboard Hot 100. Several industrial rock and industrial metal artists such as KMFDM, Fear Factory, Gravity Kills and Sister Machine Gun appeared on the 1995 Mortal Kombat: Original Motion Picture Soundtrack, which was certified platinum by the RIAA in January 1996.

Marilyn Manson released their album Antichrist Superstar in 1996, which was certified platinum by the RIAA two months after its release date. In the United States, Antichrist Superstar sold at least 1,900,000 units. Marilyn Manson's EP Smells Like Children was certified platinum in May 1998. The band's third album Mechanical Animals went to number 1, dethroning Lauryn Hill's solo debut The Miseducation of Lauryn Hill and selling 223,000 copies in its first week in stores. It was certified platinum by the RIAA in February 1999 and sold at least 1,409,000 copies in the United States. Orgy also experienced mainstream success during the 1990s. The band's 1998 album Candyass was certified platinum by the RIAA in July 1999. Orgy's cover of New Order's song "Blue Monday" went to number 56 on the Billboard Hot 100 and number 2 on the Dance Club Songs chart. White Zombie experimented with industrial metal on its 1995 album Astro-Creep: 2000, which was certified 2× platinum by the RIAA in March 1996. White Zombie's vocalist Rob Zombie began creating pure industrial metal albums in his solo career. Rob Zombie's 1998 solo debut studio album Hellbilly Deluxe was certified 3× platinum by the RIAA less than two years after its release date. In November 1999, Powerman 5000's album Tonight the Stars Revolt! was certified platinum by the RIAA. The album sold at least 1,316,172 units in the United States.

Labels 
Wax Trax! Records
Nothing Records

See also 

Industrial rock musical groups
Industrial rock sales and awards
List of industrial music bands

References

Further reading
 Blush, Steven (2001). American Hardcore: A Tribal History. Los Angeles, CA: Feral House.
 Chantler, Chris (2002). "Splitting heirs". Terrorizer, 96: 54–5.
 Connelly, Chris (2007). Concrete, Bulletproof, Invisible + Fried: My Life as a Revolting Cock. London: SAF Publishing.
 Irvin, Jim (2001). The Mojo Collection: The greatest albums of all time. Edinburgh: Canongate.
 Licht, Alan (2003). "Tunnel vision". The Wire, 233: 30–37.
 Mörat (1992). "Ye gods!" Kerrang!, 411: 12.
 Reynolds, Simon (2005). Rip it up and start again: Postpunk 1978–1984. London: Faber and Faber Limited.
 Sharp, Chris (1999). "Atari Teenage Riot: 60 second wipe out". The Wire, 183: 48–49.
 Stud, B. & Stud, T. (1987, June 20). "Heaven up here". Melody Maker: 26–27.
 Vale, Vivian; Juno, Andrea (1983). RE/Search #6-#7: Industrial culture handbook. San Francisco, CA: RE/SEARCH PUBLICATIONS.
 Reed, S. Alexander (2013). Assimilate: A Critical History of Industrial Music. Oxford University Press

Industrial music
Electronic music genres
Fusion music genres
Alternative rock genres
American rock music genres